This Is Somewhere is the second studio album, and the first on a major record label, by Grace Potter and the Nocturnals, released in August 2007 by Hollywood Records. The album debuted at #119 on the Billboard Top 200 the week of August 25, 2007 and at #1 on the Billboard Heatseekers Chart.

The album's title is a reference to Everybody Knows This Is Nowhere by Neil Young. The song "Apologies" has been featured on the television shows Kyle XY, One Tree Hill, and Brothers & Sisters, and the song "Falling or Flying" has been featured on Grey's Anatomy and ER.

The album's cover art appeared on the season four episode of "Ace of Cakes", Volcano Cakes and Mix Tapes, appearing on a cake for The Sound Garden, an indie music store.

Track listing
All tracks are written by Grace Potter.

Personnel
Adapted from AllMusic and the booklet.

The Nocturnals 
Grace Potter – vocals (all tracks), guitar (6-9), keyboards (all tracks), Mellotron (4, 6, 8), Hammond organ (all tracks), pipe organ (11)
Scott Tournet – guitar (1-6, 8-11), harmonica (3, 9), lap steel guitar (6, 7), slide guitar (9, 11), loops (6, 8, 10), Stylophone (8), whale sounds (6), background vocals (all tracks)
Bryan Dondero – bass guitar (1-6, 8-11), Echoplex (8, 10), baritone guitar (5), mandolin (7)
Matt Burr – drums (1-6, 8, 9, 11), percussion (1, 7, 8)

Additional personnel
Mike Daly – guitar (1-6, 8-11), pedal steel guitar (6), lap steel guitar (3), autoharp (7), keyboards (8), accordion (3, 7), vibraphone (6, 10), producer (all tracks)
Alan Bezozi – percussion (all tracks)
Booty Call Choir – background vocals (1, 4, 8-11)
Rob Mathes – horn arrangements (8, 11)
Jeff Kievit – trumpet (8, 11)
Michael Davis – trombone (8, 11)
Aaron Heick – alto saxophone (8, 11)
Andy Snitzer – tenor saxophone (8, 11)

References

2007 albums
Hollywood Records albums
Grace Potter and the Nocturnals albums